Sedgwick is an unincorporated community in Linn County, in the U.S. state of Missouri.

History
A post office called Sedgwick was established in 1874, and remained in operation until 1903. The community has the name of John Sedgwick, an officer in the Civil War.

References

Unincorporated communities in Linn County, Missouri
Unincorporated communities in Missouri